Hernán Oscar Cortínez (born August 4, 1973 in Morón) is a male marathon runner from Argentina, who is a two-time winner of the Buenos Aires Marathon in his native country (2003 and 2004). He represented Argentina in the men's marathon at the 2000 Summer Olympics in Sydney, Australia.

He won the gold medal in the short race at the 2001 South American Cross Country Championships.

He retired in 2012.

Personal bests
3000 m: 8:12.00 min –  Santa Fe, 4 December 2001 
5000 m: 14:18.7 min –  Buenos Aires, 28 March 1999 
10,000 m: 29:31.80 min –  Seoul,  18 September 1992
Half marathon: 1:04:58 hrs –  Osaka, 28 February 1999
Marathon: 2:13:42 hrs –  Santa Rosa, 23 April 2000

Achievements

References

External links

Tilastopaja biography
  Profile

1973 births
Living people
Argentine male long-distance runners
Argentine male marathon runners
Athletes (track and field) at the 2000 Summer Olympics
Olympic athletes of Argentina
People from Morón Partido
Sportspeople from Buenos Aires Province